Yurok (also Chillula, Mita, Pekwan, Rikwa, Sugon, Weitspek, Weitspekan) is an Algic language. It is the traditional language of the Yurok people of Del Norte County and Humboldt County on the far north coast of California, most of whom now speak English. The last known native speaker died in 2013. As of 2012, Yurok language classes were taught to high school students, and other revitalization efforts were expected to increase the population of speakers.

The standard reference on the Yurok language grammar is by R. H. Robins (1958).

Name
Concerning the etymology of Yurok ( Weitspekan), this below is from Campbell (1997):

History
Decline of the language began during the California Gold Rush, due to the influx of new settlers and the diseases they brought with them. Native American boarding schools initiated by the United States government with the intent of incorporating the native populations of America into mainstream American society increased the rate of decline of the language.

Current status
The program to revive Yurok has been lauded as the most successful language revitalization program in California. As of 2014, there are six schools in Northern California that teach Yurok - four high schools and two elementary schools. Rick Jordan, principal of Eureka High School, one of the schools with a Yurok Language Program, remarks on the impact that schools can have on the vitality of a language, "A hundred years ago, it was our organizations that were beating the language out of folks, and now we're trying to re-instill it – a little piece of something that is much larger than us".

The last known native, active speaker of Yurok, Archie Thompson, died March 26, 2013. "He was also the last of about 20 elders who helped revitalize the language over the last few decades, after academics in the 1990s predicted it would be extinct by 2010. He made recordings of the language that were archived by UC Berkeley linguists and the tribe, spent hours helping to teach Yurok in community and school classrooms, and welcomed apprentice speakers to probe his knowledge."

Linguists at UC Berkeley began the Yurok Language Project in 2001. Professor Andrew Garrett and Dr. Juliette Blevins collaborated with tribal elders on a Yurok dictionary that has been hailed as a national model. The Yurok Language Project has gone much more in depth than just a printed lexicon, however.  The dictionary is available online and fully searchable. It is also possible to search an audio dictionary – a repository of audio clips of words and short phrases. For a more in depth study, there is a database of compiled texts where words and phrases can be viewed as part of a larger context.

As of February 2013, there are over 300 basic Yurok speakers, 60 with intermediate skills, 37 who are advanced, and 17 who are considered conversationally fluent. As of 2014, nine people are certified to teach Yurok in schools. Since Yurok, like many other Native American languages, uses a master-apprentice system to train up speakers in the language, having even nine certified teachers would not be possible without a piece of legislation passed in 2009 in the state of California that allows indigenous tribes the power to appoint their own language teachers.

Phonology

Vowels
Vowels are as follows:

Consonants
Consonants are as follows:

Notable is the lack of plain .

The glottalized approximants  may be realized as creaky voice on the preceding vowel, a preceding glottal stop, or both. They are often devoiced when they occur at the end of a word.

Yurok has front-, central-, and back-closing diphthongs. The second element of the diphthongs is considered a consonant or semivowel. This is because Yurok diphthongs are falling diphthongs and behave similarly to nasal and approximates following a vowel and preceding a pause or voiceless non-glottalized consonant.

All Yurok syllables begin with a consonant and contain at least one vowel. Here are some examples of the different kinds of syllable structure:

Morphology

Yurok morphological processes include prefixation, infixation, inflection, vowel harmony, ablaut, consonantal alternation, and reduplication.

Prefixation and infixation occur in nominals and verbals, and occasionally in other classes, although infixation occurs most frequently in verbals.

Vowel harmony occurs for prefixes, infixes, and inflections, depending on the vocalic and consonantal structure of the word stem.

Reduplication occurs mostly on verb stems but occasionally for nouns and can connote repetition, plurality, etc. Reduplication occurs on the first syllable, and sometimes a part of the second syllable:

Classifications

Numerals and adjectives can be classified according to the noun grammatically associated with them.

Tense and aspect

As in many indigenous languages of the Americas, Yurok verbs do not code tense through inflection. The time when an action takes place is inferred through both linguistic and nonlinguistic context.

On the other hand, aspect is prevalent in Yurok verbs, being indicated by preverbal particles. These occur either directly or indirectly before a verb. These can combine with verbs and other particles to indicate time and many other aspects.

Some preverbal particles include:  (completed action in the past);  (past but with ongoing effects);  (past after a negative, or in "unreal conditions");  (past with the implication of starting some action).

Basic syntax

The most common form of sentence structure consists of a Nominal + Verbal. Indeed, most other, seemingly more complex sentence structures can be viewed as expanding on this fundamental type.

Sentences can also be equational, consisting of two nominals or nominal groups:

Sentences can also be composed of one or more verbals without nominals as explicit arguments.

The same is true for nominals and nominal groups, which can stand alone as complete sentences, following a similar pattern to the equational sentences already mentioned.

Complex sentences are formed along similar principles to these, but with expanded verbals or nominals, or verbals and/or nominals connected by coordinators.

Word order is sometimes used to distinguish between the categories of subject and object.

However, if the morphological inflections are sufficiently unambiguous, it is not necessary to maintain a strict word order.

In the sentences composed of a subject and a verb, the two are often interchangeable.

Writing 
As of 2020, Yurok is written in the New Yurok Alphabet, using Latin characters. Previously, Yurok was written in the Yurok Unifon; some books cited in the Yurok Language Project contain Yurok written in the unifon, though due to practicality in writing, typing, and reading, the Latin characters are now preferred. Currently, there is a spelling reform occurring to streamline the spelling of words; thus, some letters may differ between spellings. Currently, this is the alphabet as taught at various schools.

Some books have been written partially in Yurok. One such example is the graphic novel Soldiers Unknown, written by Chag Lowry. The Yurok text in Soldiers Unknown was translated by Yurok language teacher James Gensaw, and the graphic novel was illustrated by Rahsan Ekedal.

References

Bibliography
 
Atherton, Kelley. "Back from the Brink: Learning the Yurok Language ". The Daily Triplicate. Published 16 October 2010. Accessed 30 April 2012.
 Campbell, Lyle. (1997). American Indian languages: The historical linguistics of Native America. New York: Oxford University Press.
 Dixon, Roland; & Kroeber, Alfred L. (1913). New linguistic families in California. American Anthropologist, 5, 1-26.
 Goddard, Ives. (1975). Algonquian, Wiyot, and Yurok: Proving a distant genetic relationship. In M. D. Kinkade, K. L. Hale, & O. Werner (Eds.), Linguistics and anthropology in honor of C. F. Voegelin (pp. 249–262). Lisse: Peter de Ridder Press.
 Goddard, Ives. (1979). Comparative Algonquian. In L. Campbell & M. Mithun (Eds.), The languages of native America: Historical and comparative assessment (pp. 70–132). Austin: University of Texas Press.
 Goddard, Ives. (1990). Algonquian linguistic change and reconstruction. In P. Baldi (Ed.), Linguistic change and reconstruction methodology (pp. 99–114). Berlin: Mouton de Gruyter.
 Golla, Victor. (2011). California Indian Languages. Berkeley: University of California Press. 
 Haas, Mary R. (1958). Algonkian-Ritwan: The end of a controversy. International Journal of American Linguistics, 24, 159-173.
 Hinton, Leanne (1994). Flutes of fire: Essays on Californian Indian languages. Berkeley: Heyday Books.
 
 Michelson, Truman. 1915. Rejoinder (to Edward Sapir). American Anthropologist, 17, 4-8.
 Mithun, Marianne. (1999). The languages of Native North America. Cambridge: Cambridge University Press.  (hbk); .
 Robins, Robert H. 1958. The Yurok Language: Grammar, Texts, Lexicon. University of California Publications in Linguistics 15.
 
 
 Sapir, Edward. (1915)b. Epilogue.  American Anthropologist, 17, 198.

External links

Yurok Tribe Language Project
Yurok Language Project at the University of California, Berkeley, with sound files and a searchable dictionary
Yurok language overview at the Survey of California and Other Indian Languages
OLAC resources in and about the Yurok language
Yurok language resources  at the California Language Archive

"Yurok Language Program" Youtube channel, run by a fluent teacher

Yurok
Algic languages
Indigenous languages of California
Native American language revitalization
Languages extinct in the 2010s
Extinct languages of North America
2013 disestablishments in California
Vowel-harmony languages